Henry Grey, 1st Lord Grey of Groby (1547 – 26 July 1614) was an English landowner, soldier, courtier, magistrate, county administrator, and member of parliament.

Among many other roles, he was a member of the Honourable Corps of Gentlemen at Arms and Master of the Buckhounds.

Early life
He was the only surviving son of Lord John Grey, son of Thomas Grey, 2nd Marquess of Dorset, and Mary Browne, daughter of Sir Anthony Browne and his first wife, Alice Gage. It is believed he was educated at Christ Church, Oxford, where a Henry Grey graduated first with a Bachelor of Arts on 1 February 1565, followed by a Master of Arts on 18 June 1568. He was knighted on 11 November 1587.

Career
Grey's main ambition was to re-establish his family's position in Leicestershire lost by his father's attainder. Henry succeeded to his father's estate at Pirgo near Havering Essex when aged 17. Five years later he was appointed one of the Queen's Gentlemen Pensioners and was lieutenant of the band – head personal bodyguard – from 1589 to 1603.  He attended on the Queen six months of each year. Otherwise based 20 miles away at Pirgo in Essex he filled many local and county duties, was appointed deputy lieutenant of the county from 1586-1590 and was elected knight of the shire (MP) for the county of Essex in 1589. He was made Master of the Buckhounds in 1596.

He had been put on the commission of the peace for Essex about 1569 and in 1600 was described as the county's senior justice. His efforts for Queen and county were recognised and the completion of his court duties noted when another cousin, James I, four days before his coronation, raised him to the peerage on 21 July 1603 as Baron Grey of Groby, Leicestershire.

By this time, 1603, he had managed to reacquire most of his family's estates lost by his father's attainder. Those in Leicestershire centred on Bradgate House in its manor of Groby, a few miles from Leicester. As the new Lord Grey of Groby, aged 58, he took up residence at Bradgate and devoted most of his energies to strengthening his family's position in the County. This included reviving the feud and intense competition between the Greys and the Hastings earls of Huntingdon which had enlivened and divided Leicestershire for much of the early sixteenth century.

Private life
Grey married Anne (1542–1613/14), daughter of William, 2nd Lord Windsor of Bradenham, Buckinghamshire. 

Henry and Anne had four sons and two daughters including:
 Sir John Grey, who married Elizabeth Nevill, died suddenly, in October 1611 in his father's lifetime. Their son Henry Grey succeeded his grandfather as Lord Grey of Groby and was created the first Earl of Stamford;
 Henry Grey, 'slain in Holland';
 Ambrose Grey, father of Mary, Lady Wrottesley, wife of Sir Walter Wrottesley, 1st Baronet;
 George Grey, who left no surviving children;
 Mary Grey, who married firstly, William Sulyard and secondly, Thomas Steward, the grandson of Augustine Steward of Norwich; and
 Elizabeth Grey, wife of Sir Anthony Felton (d.1613) of Playford, the mother of Sir Henry Felton, 1st Baronet of Playford, Suffolk, who married Dorothy Gawdy, the daughter of Sir Bassingbourne Gawdy, and had Sir Henry Felton, 2nd Baronet. Sir Henry Felton, 2nd Baronet became a ward at 5 years old, and Elizabeth, Lady Felton succeeded in being awarded a part of his wardship, with the help of Bassingbourne Gawdy.

Grey died at Bradgate House on 26 July 1614, newly widowed, and was buried in the family chapel there. He was succeeded in the barony by his grandson Henry, who later become the first Earl of Stamford.

Arms

The arms of the head of the Grey family are blazoned Barry of six argent and azure in chief three torteaux gules.

Sources

1547 births
1614 deaths
English MPs 1589
 
Henry Grey, 1st Baron Grey Of Groby
Browne family
17th-century English nobility
16th-century English nobility
Masters of the Buckhounds
People from Groby
Knights Bachelor
Deputy Lieutenants of Essex